Matthew Kenney is an American celebrity chef, entrepreneur, author, and educator specializing in plant-based cuisine. He is the author of 12 cookbooks, founder of dozens of vegan restaurants, and founder of the companies Matthew Kenney Cuisine and Matthew Kenney Culinary, a plant-based diet education business.

Early life and education 
Kenney was born in the 1960s in the U.S. state of Connecticut, and grew up in Searsport, Maine. After graduating from the University of Maine with a degree in political science, he became a chef. He attended the French Culinary Institute, now the International Culinary Center, learning classical culinary techniques. Upon graduating in 1990, he worked at various kitchens in New York City.

Career 
Kenney opened his namesake restaurant "Matthew's" in 1993 in New York City. He became Food & Wine magazine's "1994 Best New Chef". He opened the restaurants Mezze, Monzu Canteen, Commune, and Commissary. Kenney has said the economic slump caused by the September 11th terror attacks caused his restaurants to close.

Pure Food and Wine 
Kenney, partner Sarma Melngailis and investor Jeffrey Chodorow in 2004 opened a vegan restaurant, Pure Food and Wine, in New York City.

Kenney left Pure Food and Wine in 2005, and the owner and manager sued him, alleging he broke his contract.

Culinary academy 
In 2009, Kenney opened his first culinary academy in Oklahoma City. In 2012, he moved the renamed Matthew Kenney Culinary Academy to Santa Monica, California, and relocated his company to Los Angeles. In 2013, he established a campus of the Academy in Belfast, Maine. In 2017, he sold the Academy to Adam Zucker.

Matthew Kenney Cuisine 
In 2012 Kenney formed Matthew Kenney Cuisine, a Los Angeles-based restaurant lifestyle company offering a variety of plant-based services and products, including hospitality, education, media, products and services. As of 2022, Matthew Kenney Cuisine operates more than 50 active restaurants, in more than 12 countries.

In 2017, he was sued for unpaid rent at the popular Plant Food and Wine in Miami. In December 2017, he faced debt and foreclosure proceedings in Belfast, Maine, on a building that housed his former culinary academy.

In 2019, Matthew Kenney Cuisine opened an all-vegan food hall Plant City in Providence, Rhode Island. In 2019, he launched Ntidote Life nutrition bars with Dr. Amir Marashi.

Restaurants

Active 

Hungry Angelina, Long Beach, California (2020-present)
Liora, Baltimore, Maryland (2021-present)
Double Zero, Baltimore, Maryland (2021-present)

Closed

Awards

Published works

References 

Living people
Raw foodists
American chefs
American male chefs
American restaurateurs
People from Maine
Plant-based diet advocates
University of Maine alumni
Year of birth missing (living people)